Charles George Fletcher (December 31, 1890 – July 28, 1959) was a lawyer and political figure in Ontario. He represented Essex South in the Legislative Assembly of Ontario from 1926 to 1929 and from 1937 to 1943 as a Liberal member.

He was born in Tilbury East Township, Kent, Ontario, the son of David Fletcher and Catherine Logie, both Scottish immigrants. He was educated at the University of Toronto and Osgoode Hall and later moved to Leamington. Fletcher served in France with Princess Patricia's Canadian Light Infantry during World War I. He was defeated when he ran for reelection to the Ontario assembly in 1929 but was later reelected in 1937. Fletcher served as sheriff for Essex County for a number of years. He died in Chatham-Kent, Ontario at the age of 68.

References

External links

1890 births
1959 deaths
Ontario Liberal Party MPPs